The Cachorro River is a tributary of the Trombetas River in Pará state in north-central Brazil.

The Cachorro River flows through the  Trombetas State Forest from north to south, and joins the Trombetas within the forest.

See also
List of rivers of Pará

References

Rivers of Pará